Karin Prinsloo (born 2 December 1989) is a South African swimmer. She was a member of the 2012 South Africa Olympic team, and competed in two individual events at the 2012 Summer Olympics in London.

Personal life
Prinsloo was born in Marble Hall, Limpopo, in 1989 and she attended Ben Viljoen High School in Groblersdal, where she graduated in 2007.

Then she attended University of Pretoria in Pretoria, South Africa, where she is coached by Igor Omeltchenko.

Swimming career

All Africa Games 2011
Prinsloo narrowly missed out on the gold medal in the woman's 100 m backstroke, where she was up against African record holder Kirsty Coventry, of Zimbabwe. Coventry touched first in 1:00.86 with Prinsloo less than a second behind in 1:01.46 and Amel Melih, of Algeria, third in 1:07.27.

Prinsloo struck gold later as part of the women's 4 × 100 m relay team of Natasha de Vos, Roxanne Tammadge and Suzaan van Biljon.

2012 Summer Olympics
At the 2012 Summer Olympics she finished 20th overall in the heats in the Women's 200 metre freestyle with a time of 1:59.24, and failed to reach the semifinals. She reached the finals of the 200 m backstroke, but was not fast enough to reach the final.

2014 Commonwealth Games 
At the 2014 Commonwealth Games, Prinsloo competed in the 100 m and 200 m freestyle, and the  freestyle,  freestyle and  medley relays.

References

1989 births
Living people
People from Ephraim Mogale Local Municipality
Afrikaner people
South African people of Dutch descent
South African female swimmers
Olympic swimmers of South Africa
Swimmers at the 2012 Summer Olympics
South African female freestyle swimmers
African Games gold medalists for South Africa
African Games silver medalists for South Africa
Swimmers at the 2014 Commonwealth Games
Competitors at the 2011 All-Africa Games
Swimmers at the 2015 African Games
African Games medalists in swimming
Sportspeople from Limpopo
Commonwealth Games competitors for South Africa
20th-century South African women
21st-century South African women